Monkey Island is the seventh studio album by American rock band The J. Geils Band, though it is credited with the shortened band name of "Geils", the only album in their catalog that this was done. The album was released on June 9, 1977, by Atlantic Records.

The album did not perform well in the marketplace, and would be the J. Geils Band's last original album for Atlantic Records after almost eight years with the label. It was, however, the band's first album on which they did not use an outside producer, as well as their first project with recording engineer David Thoener, with whom they later collaborated on their best-selling albums Love Stinks and Freeze Frame.

The album contains the studio version of "I Do," a live recording of which (from the album Showtime!) would be the J. Geils Band's last hit single in 1982.

Track listing
All songs written by Peter Wolf and Seth Justman except as noted

Personnel
Peter Wolf – lead vocals
J. Geils – guitar
Magic Dick – harmonica
Seth Justman – keyboards
Danny Klein – bass
Stephen Jo Bladd – drums

Additional personnel
Evette Benton – background vocals 
Michael Brecker – tenor saxophone
Randy Brecker – trumpet
Michelle Cobbs – background vocals 
Ronnie Cuber – saxophone
Lew Del Gatto – saxophone
Cissy Houston – background vocals
Barbara Ingram – background vocals
Arif Mardin – strings conductor
Theresa Reed – background vocals 
Alan Rubin – trumpet
Lew Soloff – trumpet
G. Diane Sumler – background vocals 
Harriet Tharpe – background vocals 
Luther Vandross – background vocals 
Frank Vicari – saxophone

Production
Producers: J. Geils Band
Engineer: David Thoener
Assistant engineers: Jay Krugman, Rod O'Brien, Corky Stasiak
Mixing: David Thoener
Remastering: George Marino
Design: Peter Corriston
Photography: Alen MacWeeney

Charts
Album

Singles

References

1977 albums
The J. Geils Band albums
Atlantic Records albums
Albums with cover art by Peter Corriston